Kamenny is a rural locality (a settlement) and the administrative center of Kamenskoye Rural Settlement, Gorodishchensky District, Volgograd Oblast, Russia. The population was 1,398 as of 2010. There are 24 streets.

Geography 
Kamenny is located in steppe, 35 km northeast of Gorodishche (the district's administrative centre) by road. Yerzovka is the nearest rural locality.

References 

Rural localities in Gorodishchensky District, Volgograd Oblast